Skwarczyński (masculine),  Skwarczyńska (feminine) is a Polish surname. Notable people with the surname include:

Adam Skwarczyński (1886–1934), Polish independence activist and politician
Stanisław Skwarczyński
Stefania Skwarczyńska

See also
Skwierczyński

Polish-language surnames